Cyperus radians is a species of sedge that is native to eastern parts of Asia.

See also 
 List of Cyperus species

References 

radians
Plants described in 1837
Flora of Borneo
Flora of China
Flora of Indonesia
Flora of Malaysia
Flora of Myanmar
Flora of Sri Lanka
Flora of Taiwan
Flora of Thailand
Flora of Vietnam
Taxa named by Carl Sigismund Kunth